Nemanja Simeunović (Serbian Cyrillic: Немања Симеуновић; born September 21, 1984) is a Serbian retired footballer.

Playing career 
Simeunović began his career in 2007 with FK Bežanija in the Serbian SuperLiga, but never featured in any matches. In 2008, he signed with FK Hajduk Beograd of the Serbian First League. In 2010, he was transferred to FK Novi Sad and featured in 30 matches and recorded one goal. In 2012, he went overseas to Canada to sign with SC Waterloo Region of the Canadian Soccer League. In the 2013 season he helped Waterloo secure a postseason berth by finishing fifth in the overall standings. He featured in the CSL Championship match against Kingston FC, and secured the club's first championship by a score of 3-1. In the 2015 season the club finished fourth in the standings and secure a postseason berth. He featured in the Championship match against Toronto Croatia, but lost the match by a score of 1-0. In 2016, after the relegation of SC Waterloo he signed with Scarborough SC.

References 

1984 births
Living people
Sportspeople from Valjevo
Serbian footballers
FK Hajduk Beograd players
RFK Novi Sad 1921 players
SC Waterloo Region players
Scarborough SC players
Serbian White Eagles FC players
Serbian First League players
Canadian Soccer League (1998–present) players
Association football defenders